Swansea Riverside railway station served the city of Swansea, in the historical county of Glamorganshire, Wales, from 1899 to 1933 on the Rhondda and Swansea Bay Railway.

History 
The station was opened as Swansea on 7 May 1899 by the Rhondda and Swansea Bay Railway, although there is evidence of it being in use in 1895. Its name was changed to Swansea Docks on 1 July 1924 and changed again to Swansea Riverside on 17 September 1926. It closed on 11 September 1933.

References 

Disused railway stations in Swansea
Railway stations in Great Britain opened in 1899
Railway stations in Great Britain closed in 1933
1895 establishments in Wales
1933 disestablishments in Wales